Gonzalo Antonio Collao Villegas (born 9 September 1997) is a Chilean professional footballer who plays as a goalkeeper for Chilean club Palestino.

Club career
Born in Coquimbo, Collao joined Universidad de Chile's youth setup at the age of 14, from Coquimbo Unido. He was promoted to the first team ahead of the 2017 season, and made his senior debut on 22 July of that year by coming on as a substitute for injured Fernando de Paul in a 2–0 Copa Chile win against Ñublense.

In January 2018, Collao joined Cobreloa in Primera B on loan for one year. He returned to his parent club in the following year, after making eight appearances.

On 26 August 2019, Collao agreed to a deal with Segunda División side Extremadura UD on a free transfer, effective as of 1 January 2020; he was initially assigned to the reserves in Tercera División. On 24 January 2020 he joined the Spanish club. 

On 10 July 2021, he moved to Istra 1961 in the Croatian Prva HNL on a deal for three seasons.

At the end of 2022, he returned to his homeland and joined Palestino for the 2023 season.

International career
Collao represented Chile at under-20 level before being called up for the full side on 14 March 2018, for two friendlies against Denmark and Sweden. He made his full international debut on 31 May, in a 3–2 friendly loss against Romania.

References

External links

1997 births
Living people
People from Coquimbo
Chilean footballers
Chile under-20 international footballers
Chile international footballers
Chilean expatriate footballers
Association football goalkeepers
Primera B de Chile players
Chilean Primera División players
Coquimbo Unido footballers
Universidad de Chile footballers
Cobreloa footballers
Club Deportivo Palestino footballers
Tercera División players
Segunda División players
Extremadura UD B players
Extremadura UD footballers
Croatian Football League players
NK Istra 1961 players
Chilean expatriate sportspeople in Spain
Expatriate footballers in Spain
Chilean expatriate sportspeople in Croatia
Expatriate footballers in Croatia